Hurez may refer to several places in Romania:

 Hurez, a village in Beclean Commune, Brașov County
 Hurez, a village in Horoatu Crasnei Commune, Sălaj County
 Hurez (Ciolt), a tributary of the river Ciolt in Arad County
 Hurez, a tributary of the river Olt in Brașov County